Notes 4 You is an album by vocal group Bright. The album contains all A-side single songs they released under the Rhythm Zone label so far. The DVD contains clips of their one-man Live show and a documentary of their Kyoto street live performances. The album was ranked at #47 and sold 2,805 copies in its first week.

Track listing 
Theme of Bright: Notes 4 You 
Love & Joy 
ソライロ
One Summer Time 
So Long, Too Late 
I’ll Be There 
My Darling: I Love You feat. Scoobie Do 
Interlude: Brighten Up
Watch Out 
You Were Mine 
恋をして 
手紙 feat. K: Album ver.
Believe 
Brightest Star: Unplugged (bonus track)

DVD track listing
Sora Iro (ソライロ) (music video)
Tegami (手紙) feat. K: Album ver. (music video)
One Summer Time (music video)
I'll Be There (music video)
Tears (live video)
Dance Interlude (live video)
Orenji (オレンジ): Unplugged (live video)
My Girl (live video)
Street Live In Kyoto: Document Video 2007–2008
Brightest Star (bonus live video)

Chart

References

Bright (Japanese band) albums
Avex Group albums
2009 albums